Toxidia arfakensis is a butterfly of the family Hesperiidae. It is found in New Guinea.

References

External links
Insects of Papua New Guinea

Trapezitinae
Butterflies described in 1917
Butterflies of Oceania
Taxa named by James John Joicey
Taxa named by George Talbot (entomologist)